Christopher Flynn (December 1828 – October 15, 1889) was an Irish soldier who fought in the American Civil War with the 14th Connecticut Infantry, Company K. Flynn received the United States' highest award for bravery during combat, the Medal of Honor, for his action during the Battle of Gettysburg in Pennsylvania on 3 July 1863. He was honored with the award on 1 December 1864.

Biography
Flynn was born in Ireland on December 15, 1829. He enlisted with the 14th Connecticut Infantry Regiment in August 1862, and mustered out in May 1865. He died on 15 October 1889 and his remains are interred at the Saint Marys Cemetery in Connecticut. During Gettysburg, he captured the flag of the 52nd North Carolina.

Medal of Honor citation

See also

List of Medal of Honor recipients for the Battle of Gettysburg
List of American Civil War Medal of Honor recipients: A–F

References

1828 births
1889 deaths
American Civil War recipients of the Medal of Honor
Irish-born Medal of Honor recipients
Military personnel from Connecticut
People from Sprague, Connecticut
People of Connecticut in the American Civil War
Union Army officers
United States Army Medal of Honor recipients